Yun Duk-min (born December 8, 1959) is a South Korean political scientist who is the current ambassador of South Korea to Japan. He was a former chancellor of the Korea National Diplomatic Academy.

References

Living people
1959 births
People from Seoul
Hankuk University of Foreign Studies alumni
University of Wisconsin–Madison alumni
Keio University alumni
Academic staff of Hankuk University of Foreign Studies
Ambassadors of South Korea to Japan